Alexander Muir (5 April 1830 – 26 June 1906) was a Canadian songwriter, poet, soldier, and school headmaster. He was the composer of The Maple Leaf Forever, which he wrote in October 1867 to celebrate the Confederation of Canada.

Early life
In 1833 Muir immigrated to Toronto, Ontario, from Lesmahagow, Scotland, where he grew up and he was educated by his father. Muir later studied at Queen's College, where he graduated in 1851.

Career

Muir taught in the Greater Toronto Area in such places as Scarborough and Toronto, as well as in Newmarket, Beaverton, and in then suburban areas as Parkdale and Leslieville, where he lived on Laing Avenue.

During the early 1870s, Alexander Muir was an elementary school teacher in Newmarket. When the cornerstone of the Christian Church in Newmarket was being laid on June 25, 1874, by the Governor General, Lord Dufferin, Muir brought his school choir to the event to sing his new composition The Maple Leaf Forever, its first public performance.

From 1860 to 1870, he was principal of Leslieville School in Toronto. He was later (1888-1901) principal of Toronto's Alexander Muir/Gladstone Junior and Senior Public School (renamed after his death in his honour).

Muir was a noted Canadian Orangeman. He joined The Queen's Own Rifles of Canada in 1860 and served as Lieutenant in No. 10 (Highland) Company, fighting with them at the Battle of Ridgeway being wounded in the arm. He was later awarded the Canada General Service Medal. He also wrote The Maple Leaf Forever while he was serving with the regiment.

Music

Although Muir's musical activities were on an amateur level, they were strongly emphasized along with athletics and patriotism during his teaching career. Muir wrote several songs about Canada during his career, including Canada Forever and Young Canada Was Here, but his most enduring composition was The Maple Leaf Forever  written in 1867, the year of Confederation. Muir originally wrote the poem for a patriotic poetry contest in Montreal, winning second prize. He then looked for an existing melody that would fit, a very common practice (it was not unusual for a poem printed in a journal to bear the statement "May be sung to the tune of..."). When he failed to find a suitable tune, Muir wrote the music himself.

Legacy

 Alexander Muir Memorial Gardens, a formal garden and park, just south of Yonge Street and Lawrence Avenue in the Lawrence Park neighbourhood of Toronto, is named in his honour.
 Maple Leaf Forever Park is in the rear of Maple Cottage at 62 Laing Street, near Leslie Street and Queen Street East in Toronto.
 Schools which have been named after him are:
Alexander Muir/Gladstone Ave Junior and Senior Public School, 108 Gladstone Ave., Toronto
Alexmuir Junior Public School, 95 Alexmuir Blvd., Scarborough
Alexander Muir Public School, 75 Ford Wilson Blvd., Newmarket
formerly Alex Muir Public School, 188 Kohler St., Sault Ste Marie which has now been repurposed into a 16 unit apartment building.
Three maple leaf symbols were honored after him is affixed in the crest of Woburn Collegiate Institute.
Mount Muir in Alberta/British Columbia is named for him.

References

Bibliography

External links 

The Maple Leaf Forever MP3
The Maple Leaf Forever MIDI File
The Maple Leaf Forever Johnson, Edward, 1878-1959

1830 births
1906 deaths
People from Lesmahagow
People of the Fenian raids
Heads of schools in Canada
Scottish emigrants to pre-Confederation Ontario
Queen's Own Rifles of Canada
Canadian songwriters
Musicians from Toronto
Immigrants to Upper Canada
National anthem writers